The December 1910 United Kingdom general election was held from 3 to 19 December. It was the last general election to be held over several days and the last to be held before the First World War.

The election took place following the efforts of the Liberal government to pass its People's Budget in 1909, which raised taxes on the wealthy to fund social welfare programs. The 1909 budget was only agreed to by the House of Lords in April 1910 after the January general election in which the Liberals and the Irish Parliamentary Party gained a majority. The Government called a further election in December 1910 to get a mandate for the Parliament Act 1911, which would prevent the House of Lords from permanently blocking legislation linked to money bills ever again, and to obtain King George V's agreement to threaten to create sufficient Liberal peers to pass that act (in the event this did not prove necessary, as the Lords voted to curtail their own powers).

The Conservative Party, led by Arthur Balfour with their Liberal Unionist allies, and the Liberal Party, led by Prime Minister H. H. Asquith, almost exactly repeated the numerical result produced in the January election, with the Conservatives again winning the largest number of votes. The Liberal Party under Asquith remained in government with the support of the Irish Parliamentary Party. This was the last election in which the Liberals won the highest number of seats in the House of Commons. It was also the last United Kingdom general election in which a party other than Labour or the Conservatives won the most seats.

Results

|}

Voting summary

Seats summary

See also
List of MPs elected in the December 1910 United Kingdom general election
Parliamentary franchise in the United Kingdom 1885–1918
December 1910 United Kingdom general election in Ireland

References

Further reading

External links
United Kingdom election results—summary results 1885–1979

Manifestos
December 1910 Conservative manifesto
December 1910 Labour manifesto
December 1910 Liberal manifesto

 
General elections to the Parliament of the United Kingdom
General election
December 1910 events
1910 in British politics
H. H. Asquith